Stephen M. Gersten (born 2 December 1940) was an American mathematician, specializing in finitely presented groups and their geometric properties.

Gersten graduated in 1961 with an AB from Princeton University and in 1965 with a PhD from Trinity College, Cambridge. His doctoral thesis was Class Groups of Supplemented Algebras written under the supervision of John R. Stallings. In the late 1960s and early 1970s he taught at Rice University. In 1972–1973 he was a visiting scholar at the Institute for Advanced Study. In 1973 he became a professor at the University of Illinois at Urbana–Champaign. In 1974 he was an Invited Speaker at the International Congress of Mathematicians in Vancouver. At the University of Utah he became a professor in 1975 and is now semi-retired there.  His PhD students include Roger C. Alperin and Edward W. Formanek.

Gersten's conjecture has motivated considerable research.

Gersten's theorem
If  is an automorphism of a finitely generated free group  then
} is finitely generated.

Selected publications

 
 
 (See Weierstrass preparation theorem.)
 (This paper presents a proof of a conjecture made by G. Peter Scott.)

See also
Baumslag–Gersten group

References

1940 births
Living people
Group theorists
Topologists
20th-century American mathematicians
21st-century American mathematicians
Princeton University alumni
Alumni of Trinity College, Cambridge
Rice University faculty
University of Utah faculty
University of Illinois Urbana-Champaign faculty